Ben Rice is an American record producer, sound engineer, mixer, songwriter, and musician. He is best known for his work with musical artists Valerie June, Norah Jones, The Candles, Jonas Brothers, James Bay, and The Skins, as well as record producers Eddie Kramer, Gus van Go, and Youth. In 2021 Rice received a nomination for Producer of the Year at the Americana Awards for his work on Valerie June's album “The Moon and Stars: Prescriptions For Dreamers”, which was nominated for Album of the Year.

Rice owns Degraw Sound – a recording studio in Brooklyn, New York.

Early years 
Fascinated by recording and songwriting, Rice began making 4-track recordings when he was twelve and landed his first studio job at the age of sixteen.

Musical career

2003–2009: Surefire 
Rice formed the band Surefire with his childhood friends: Nicolas Panken (guitar), Jacob Sloan (bass), and Justin Aaronson (drums); he served as the band's lead vocalist, guitarist, and songwriter from 2003 to 2009.

Early success 
Fueled by their live shows, Rice's band built a cult-following on Myspace.

This led to notable press in publications, including the New York magazine. Rice leveraged this publicity to secure a series of gigs with the Arctic Monkeys, The Bravery, Brendan Benson, Mando Diao, The Shore, The Sights, and The Subways.

Surefire's sound was often compared to the music of Tom Petty; however, Rice fused contemporary indie rock, 1960's blues rock, and 1970s psychedelic rock to produce his own unique, style of music. One music-critic noted that Rice's compositions were "quite distinctive...a purely personal musical reflection" of the eras,; this musical review was echoed by other media outlets that often compared his musical-style to Petty, Coldplay, and even Cream.

Rice's creative songwriting and compositions helped establish Surefire in the New York City music scene; before they were signed, the band was regularly selling-out shows at concert venues – including the Bowery Ballroom.

Lizard King Records / Warner Music Group 
Surefire's early success afforded them an opportunity to record a series of demos with renown, record producers Gus van Go and Werner F.

Impressed by these demos, Surefire's growing fandom, and their ability to sell-out venues, Lizard King Records founder and CEO Martin Heath signed Rice and the band to his label in early 2006, which already represented artists like The Killers, The Pierces, and Santigold.

Shortly thereafter, the band again had the opportunity to record with the Gus Van Go / Werner F. team – creating an untitled EP for Lizard King Records / Warner Music Group. Unfortunately, this EP was shelved by the record label and ultimately never released.

Led by Rice, Surefire later recorded the track "Surrender" for the 2005 War Child compilation album Help!: A Day in the Life. Other artists featured on this album included Coldplay, Gorillaz, Radiohead, Keane, and Damien Rice.

Surefire LP and later years 
Citing a difference in musical vision, Surefire left Lizard King Records in 2007 to independently record and release their first, full-length album. Rice co-produced this self-titled album with legendary, record producer Eddie Kramer. With the release of the record: Surefire, the band continued to tour until their disbandment in late 2009.

2009–2011: Blackbells 

After Surefire, Rice fronted the indie rock band: Blackbells, whose sound was compared to British artists: The Verve and Oasis. Rice produced two EPs with this group, and witnessed commercial success with musical features on CMJ College Radio, HBO TV, and the USA Network.

Blackbells EP 
Rice produced the 2010 self-titled Blackbells EP. This album quickly climbed the charts to reach No. 18 on the CMJ College Radio chart.

During this time, Blackbells toured the United States and Canada and performed with artists Alberta Cross, Band of Skulls, The Crash Kings, The Greenhornes, J Mascis, and Marcy Playground. With the band, Rice made appearances at the 2010/2011 SXSW music festival, showcased at Brooklyn-Vegan's 2010 "CMJ Showcase" (a music festival), and played at the John Varvatos store in New York City.

IxI EP 
Later in 2011, Rice also produced Blackbells sophomore release: IxI EP.

Like Blackbells first release, this EP was a commercial success with musical features in USA Network's Necessary Roughness television drama (episode #308) and in the premier season of HBO's 24/7 sports show (episodes #1–2). Blackbells songs "Bad Bones" and "Testify" were featured in theses HBO and USA Network TV shows. Later, Rice and his other Blackbells bandmates appeared at the DeLuna Music Festival.

Throughout the years with Blackbells and Surefire, Rice was often the front-man featured in news and entertainment media, including interviews with Quiksilver, a retail sporting company, and Last Call with Carson Daly – a late-night talk show. Rice established Degraw Sound, a recording studio, following Blackbells disbandment in 2011.

2018–present: Solo career 

As a solo artist, Rice has released three singles - "The Getaway", "Autumn Days", and "I Think We Got It Right" - to favorable reviews, drawing musical comparisons to Tom Petty, Ray LaMontagne, Bon Iver, and Iron & Wine.

In 2021 Rice released the full-length solo album “Future Pretend” which once again drew favorable reviews for a “courageous speculation of waning national identity. With hints of country and Americana flair, this gentle listen primes its audience for a critical reflection on today's American dream paradox and comparisons to Tom Petty, Oasis and The Strokes.

Professional work, notable collaborations, and select discography

Degraw Sound 
Rice owns Degraw Sound – a recording studio in Brooklyn, NY.

According to an interview by Mix magazine, Rice credits the success of his business to hard-work, long-hours, and advice given by his former-producer and manager Gus van Go, who encouraged Rice to pursue a professional career in sound-production and studio-recording.

At Degraw Sound, Rice is known to produce unique compositions by collaborating with the artist, rather than directing their musical-style.
	

His professional credits include record production, engineering, and mixing sessions for a variety of artists – with a focus on indie rock, indie pop, and Americana. Some of his most notable work includes collaborations with artists The Candles (feat. Norah Jones), Aoife O'Donovan, The Districts, the Skins, Silya & The Sailors, Goldkey, Reckless Sons, and The Jezabels.

Degraw Fest 
Rice founded Degraw Fest in 2017 - a music festival which features artists who record at his studio: Degraw Sound. The 2018 festival was featured in The New York Times - as a must-see event. Building on its prior success, the 2019 festival featured a series of performances at the Brooklyn Bridge Park (BBP) - hosted in partnership with the BBP Conservancy and Degraw Sound. Degraw Fest 2019 coincided with the park's 20th anniversary of hosting free programs. Over the years, Degraw Fest has featured artists including: AMFM, Bell the Band, Ben Rice, Common Jack, Eighty Ninety, Elliot and The Ghost, Fiama, Goldkey, GRITS, Kevin Daniel, Pearla, Queue, Sophie Colette, and Yella Belly.

Notable collaborations and appearances 
After producing Reno Bo's album Happenings and Other Things (2009), Rice briefly toured with the Nashville-based rocker to promote the new record; this collaboration marked the first time that Rice produced an album, where he was not the primary artist.

Rice also produced, engineered, and mixed The Skins debut EP. Later, he engineered The Skins' single "Rude Girl", which was produced by Michael Einziger and Chad Hugo, as part of an album distributed by Republic Records. In 2014: Rice produced, engineered, and mixed the full-length album Unanchored (Sony/RCA) for Norwegian artist: Silya & the Sailors'''. Silya's single, Sucka, charted at #1 on iTunes in Norway.

Later, Rice produced The Candles' 2016 Matter + Spirit'' album, which featured the guest vocals of singer/songwriter Norah Jones.

Rice played guitar and engineered on the Jonas Brothers 2019 Billboard #1 song “Like It’s Christmas”

In 2021 Rice received a nomination for Producer of the Year at the Americana Awards for his work on Valerie June’s album “The Moon and Stars: Prescriptions For Dreamers”, which was nominated for Album of the Year and reached #1 on the Americana Radio Airplay Albums Chart.

Select discography 

References

Year of birth missing (living people)
Living people
Record producers from New York (state)